Hubbick is a surname. Notable people with the surname include:

Dave Hubbick (born 1960), English footballer
Harry Hubbick (1910–1992), English footballer

See also
Hubback